Weißensee (German: white lake) may refer to:

Places
Weissensee (Berlin), a district of Berlin
Weißensee, Thuringia, a town in Thuringia, Germany
Weissensee, Austria, a municipality in Carinthia, Austria
Weissensee (Carinthia), a lake in Carinthia, Austria
Weißensee (Füssen), a lake in Allgäu, Bavaria, Germany

People
Friedrich Weissensee (c.1560–1622), German composer and Protestant minister

Other
Weissensee, a song by Neu! from their eponymous first album
Weissensee, a song by Elder_(band) from their 2019 album The Gold & Silver Sessions
Weissensee (TV series), a German television series

See also
White Lake (disambiguation)